Microsyops is a plesiadapiform primate found in Middle Eocene in North America. It is in the family Microsyopidae. It appears to have had a more developed sense of smell than other early primates. It is believed to have eaten fruit, and its fossils show the oldest known dental cavities in a mammal.

References

Plesiadapiformes
Prehistoric primate genera
Eocene primates
Ypresian life
Lutetian life
Bartonian life
Wasatchian
Bridgerian
Uintan
Eocene mammals of North America
Fossils of the United States
Paleontology in California
Paleontology in Colorado
Paleontology in Montana
Paleontology in New Mexico
Paleontology in North Dakota
Paleontology in Texas
Paleontology in Utah
Paleontology in Wyoming
Fossil taxa described in 1875
Taxa named by Joseph Leidy